Delijan (also Romanized as Delījān, Dalijān, and Dilījān) is a city and capital of Delijan County, Markazi Province, Iran.  At the 2006 census, its population was 31,852, in 8,779 families. Delijan is located 80 km (50 Mi) from Qom and 160 km (100 Mi) from Isfahan. The native population of Delijan speaks a dialect they call Delijani (or Diligoni in the native language). The native language of Delijan seems to be a version of the old-Persian language, which is similar to the language spoken in Abyaneh one of the oldest Persian village located about an hour away from Delijan. Sites of interest include the 15th Khordad dam and Chal Nakhjir cave as well as its hot spring resort. Delijan is an industrial city and is home to several popular carpet companies like the Mahestan, Setareh Talaii and Said companies. Also home of several companies producing a type of roof isolation called "Isogam". The area North-East of Delijan is populated by seven villages, this area is referred to as Jasb. Moreover, Chal-nakhjir Cave or Delijan Cave is one of the natural touristic attractions of Delijan. The city is twinned with Dilijan, Armenia.

References

Cities in Markazi Province
Populated places in Delijan County